The Seven Sisters, part of the Holyoke Range and located within the Pioneer Valley region of Massachusetts, United States, are a series of basalt ridgeline knobs between Mount Holyoke and Mount Hitchcock (there are more than seven distinct peaks). The knobs offer scenic clifftop views interspersed with oak savanna woodlands. The Seven Sisters are traversed by the Metacomet-Monadnock Trail and is part of the New England National Scenic Trail

The Seven Sisters are the location of the Seven Sisters Trail Race every spring, a twelve-mile (19 km) "out-and-back" run that often leaves its runners bloody, bruised and exhausted. 

In response to a proposed suburban development on the Seven Sisters in the late 1990s, several non-profit groups and local governments worked together to block construction and acquire the ridgeline for the J.A. Skinner State Park.

Coincidentally, the seven sisters are near two of the Seven Sisters Colleges.

See also
 Metacomet Ridge
 Metacomet-Monadnock Trail
 Robert Frost Trail (Massachusetts)

Adjacent summits

References

 The Metacomet-Monadnock Trail Guide. 9th Edition. The Appalachian Mountain Club. Amherst, Massachusetts, 1999.
 Save the Mountain Website cited Dec. 2, 2007. 
 Seven Sisters Trail Race Cited November, 2007.

Mountains of Hampshire County, Massachusetts
Mountains of Massachusetts
Holyoke Range